Nordin is a common Swedish surname, carried by 10,805 people in Sweden. North American immigrants sometimes spelled it Nordeen, to emulate the Swedish emphasis on the second syllable. Similar Swedish surnames are Nordén (carried by 1,788), Nordling (1,166), Norén (6,033), Norin (1,834), and Norlin (2,167). 
Nordin and Nordeen can also be spellings of the Arabic name Nur al-Din. "Nor" or "Nur" is an Arabic word, which means light and "Al-Din,” “Deen,” or "Din" means religion.

Notable people with the surname include:
 Alice Nordin (1871–1948), Swedish sculptor
 Anders Nordin, Brazilian drummer (adopted by Swedish parents)
 Arnaud Nordin (born 1998), French football midfielder
 Birgit Nordin (1934–2022), Swedish operatic soprano
 Carl Gustaf Nordin (1749–1812), Swedish statesman, historian and ecclesiastic
 Elisabet Anrep-Nordin (1857–1947), Swedish educator
 Hans Nordin (disambiguation), multiple people 
 Håkan Nordin, Swedish ice hockey player
 Jake Nordin, American football tight end
 Jesper Nordin (disambiguation), multiple people 
 Jonas Nordin (born 1968), Swedish historian
 Krister Nordin, Swedish former professional football (soccer) player
 Mohamed Khaled Nordin, Malaysian politician
 Olle Nordin, Swedish football coach
 Patrik Nordin, Swedish ski mountaineer and cross-country skier
 Peter Nordin, Swedish computer scientist, entrepreneur and author
 Quinn Nordin (born 1998), American football player
 Rodrigue Nordin, French sprinter
 Sariana Nordin (born 1976), Bruneian aviator
 Siiri Nordin, Finnish singer
 Sten Nordin, Swedish politician of the Moderate Party
 Sven Nordin, Norwegian actor

References

Swedish-language surnames